Adyanpara Falls is a cascading waterfall in the Kurmbalangodu village of Nilambur taluk in Kerala, India. This is a seasonal waterfall. During Summer, water flow is low. This waterfall is of a natural cascading style as the waterfall descends over the rock. Adyanpara Weir is situated near to this falls.

Gallery

See also
List of waterfalls in India

References

Waterfalls of Kerala